John Delbridge (1564 – 24 June 1639) was an English merchant from Devon who was elected six times as a Member of Parliament.

Early life and education
He was the second son of Richard Delbridge (d. post 1595), a merchant of Barnstaple, by his wife Alice. He matriculated at Emmanuel College, Cambridge on 3 July 1604 and entered the Middle Temple on 10 May 1606.

Career
He was elected to Parliament to represent his home town, the borough of Barnstaple, in the years 1614, 1621, 1624, 1625, 1626 and 1628. He served three times as mayor of Barnstaple, in 1600-1, 1615–16 and 1633–34. By 1596 he had been elected a Freeman of Barnstaple, and Capital Burgess by 1596; He was Captain of the militia of foot-infantry by 1629 and clerk of the market 1633–34. In trading activities he was a member of the East India Company (1611–21), the French Company (1611), the Virginia Company (1612-post 1623), the North West Passage Company (1612) and the Somers Island Company (1615-post1622). He was a member of the Council for Virginia in 1621. His skills and influence were noted by the great Sir Robert Cecil by whom he was employed from about 1602 to after 1606. He acquired the manor and advowson of West Buckland, Devon.

Marriage and children

He married on 10 January 1585 to Agnes Downe (d.1639), a daughter of Henry Downe of Barnstaple. They had 5 sons, of whom only one, Richard Delbridge, survived his father, and 3 daughters, of whom only one survived her father. His son Richard married firstly to Elizabeth Chichester (d.1628), to whom he erected a mural monument in St Peter's Church in Barnstaple, a daughter of John II Chichester (d.1608) of Hall, Bishop's Tawton, in which latter parish John Delbridge owned a country estate. The Chichesters of Hall were a junior but nevertheless wealthy branch of the leading North Devon gentry family of Chichester of Raleigh. The Inscription on the monument is as follows: "To the memorie of Elizabeth the wife of Richard Delbridge of Barnstaple, merchant, & daughter to the worthy John Chichester Esq.r of Hall, together with her child of which she died in childbirth 18 December 1628" She is depicted kneeling at a prie dieu with a baby in swaddling clothes on the ground in front of her. Above her is a lozenge showing the arms of Chichester (Chequy or and gules a chief vair a crescent for difference). On top of the monument is an escutcheon with the arms of Delbridge (Sable, a chevron argent between three swan's heads and necks couped proper) impaling Chichester.  On Richard's marriage his father settled upon him his lands in Bermuda as the following summary of a deed held by the Royal Institution of Cornwall records: "Covenant:(i) John Delbridge of Barnstaple in Devon, merchant (ii) Richard Delbridge his son and heir; to convey all lands of (i) in the Bermadoes alias Somer Islands in Somersett Tribe and Harryngton Tribe upon marriage of (ii)". 
Richard Delbridge married secondly in 1631 Elizabeth Speccot, daughter of Thomas Speccot of Speccot, in the parish of Merton, Devon although the pedigree recorded on the 1821 petition of Frances Delbridge in the North Devon Record Office states he married secondly Mary Bassett. His descendants failed to consolidate their place amongst the Devon gentry, and none served again as MP, although the office of Mayor of Barnstaple was held by Nicholas Delbridge in 1619 and by Joseph Delbridge in 1658.
Richard's son was Richard II Delbridge (d.1729) who married in 1684 Mary Reed. Their son was Richard III Delbridge (1686–1745), yeoman and freeholder, buried at "Wonworthy" (Wembworthy in North Tawton hundred), who married at "Wonworthy" to Jane Holmes (1720–1804). They had children as follows: Richard IV, Mary, Jane, Elizabeth, Anne and Frances (b.1759), of "Kinsington Mall", whose 1821 petition including a diagram of the above pedigree exists at North Devon Record Office.

Sources
Venning, Tim & Hunneyball, Paul, biography of John Delbridge published in  The History of Parliament: House of Commons 1604–1629, ed. Andrew Thrush and John P. Ferris, 2010

Further reading
Grant, Alison, Atlantic Adventurer: John Delbridge of Barnstaple, 1564-1639, Instow, 1996. (76 pages including illustrations, maps & portraits (Westcountry Studies Library: s920/DEL) 
Genealogical table of Delbridge family of Barnstaple 1625 – 1804, held at North Devon Record Office, ref:  B1/A32, consisting of a semi-literate and semi-intelligible petition made in 1821 on a roll of paper by Frances Delbridge (b.1759), 4th in descent from the Merchant John Delbridge, MP,  addressed to the "Vice Chancellor" complaining abouts threats to herself and her dog by a certain "Hull" who had reportedly referred to her as a "mad woman". Includes an impression, badly worn, of the arms of Delbridge (Sable, a chevron argent between three swan's heads and necks couped proper) on a seal of red wax. http://www.nationalarchives.gov.uk/A2A/records.aspx?cat=821-b1a&cid=-1#-1]

References

1564 births
1639 deaths
Members of the Parliament of England (pre-1707) for Barnstaple
Alumni of Emmanuel College, Cambridge
Members of the Middle Temple
Merchants from Devon
English merchants
17th-century merchants
English MPs 1614
English MPs 1621–1622
English MPs 1624–1625
English MPs 1625
English MPs 1626
English MPs 1628–1629
British East India Company people